Angelique Stannett (born 15 April 1997) is an Australian rules footballer playing for the Fremantle Football Club in the AFL Women's (AFLW). She is a former soccer player for Perth Glory in the W-League.

Early life
Stannett was born in New Zealand, arriving in Australia with her family at the age of three.

Soccer career
Stannett took up soccer at the age of six, playing for Sutherlands Park in the southern suburbs of Perth. Stannett played six matches for Perth Glory during the 2015–16 W-League season.

Australian rules football career
Stannett was drafted by Fremantle as a rookie signing. She made her debut in the four point win against  at Casey Fields in the opening round of the 2019 season.

Playing for Swan Districts in the 2019 WAFL Women's competition, Stannett won the Mandy McSherry Medal, the teams's fairest and best award, as well as the team's rookie of the year award.

Personal life
Stannett is in a relationship with Perth Glory captain Natasha Rigby.

References

External links 

1994 births
Living people
Fremantle Football Club (AFLW) players
Australian rules footballers from Western Australia
New Zealand emigrants to Australia
Australian women's soccer players
Women's association football defenders